Dalia Nausheen is a Bangladeshi Nazrul Sangeet singer. She is one of the artists who participated in the Swadhin Bangla Betar Kendra during the Bangladesh Liberation War in 1971. In recognition of her contribution to music, the government of Bangladesh awarded her the country's second highest civilian award Ekushey Padak in 2020.

Nausheen started practicing North Indian Classical music and Nazrul Sangeet at the age of five. Her father Muzharul Islam, a noted architect in South Asia, also inspired her to the music. Sudhin Das was her first teacher. She completed her five years music course in 1973 from Chhayanaut where she was taught by Sohrab Hossain, Sheikh Luthfur Rahman and Ustad Ful Muhammed. Later, she joined the same institution as a teacher.

Awards
 Ekushey Padak (2020)

References 

Living people
Recipients of the Ekushey Padak
Year of birth missing (living people)
20th-century Bangladeshi women singers
20th-century Bangladeshi singers
21st-century Bangladeshi women singers
21st-century Bangladeshi singers
Bangladeshi Nazrul Geeti singers